Max Wilhelm August Heldt (4 November 1872 – 27 December 1933) was a German politician who served as the Minister-President of Saxony from 1924 to 1929.

Life 
Heldt was born on 4 November 1872 in Potsdam, Prussia, German Empire (present-day Brandenburg, Germany). He served as the Minister-President of Saxony from 4 January 1924 to 26 June 1929. Heldt died on 27 December 1933 at the age of 61 in Dresden, Saxony, Germany and was buried in the Heidefriedhof in Dresden.

References 

1872 births
1933 deaths
Ministers-President of Saxony
People from Potsdam
Old Social Democratic Party of Germany politicians
Social Democratic Party of Germany politicians